Saint-Loup-des-Bois (before 2022: Saint-Loup) is a commune in the Nièvre department in central France. It has 474 inhabitants (2019).

See also
Communes of the Nièvre department

References

Communes of Nièvre